Finlay Massey (born 16 April 1971) was an Australian cricketer. He was a left-handed batsman and a right-arm medium-fast bowler who played for Mashonaland Under-24s. He was born in Melbourne.

Finlay made a single first-class appearance, during the 1994–95 Zimbabwean cricket season. Playing as a tailender, Massey did not bat during the match, though he bowled 23 overs, taking two wickets.

External links
Finlay Massey at Cricket Archive 

1971 births
Living people
Australian cricketers
Cricketers from Melbourne
Mashonaland cricketers